Niharika is a female Indian given name. In Sanskrit, it means a Nebula or Galaxy, dew drops or a person admired for her looks.

Notable people with the given name:

Niharika Acharya – TV News Reporter
Niharika Desai – MTV Desi VJ
Niharika Kareer – TV and film actress
Niharika Singh – Femina Miss India Earth

Indian feminine given names